Jacob George Hieronymus van Tets van Goudriaan (7 December 1812, Haarlem – 14 March 1885, Nijmegen) was a Dutch politician.

1812 births
1885 deaths
Jonkheers of the Netherlands
Ministers of Finance of the Netherlands
Ministers of the Interior of the Netherlands
King's and Queen's Commissioners of Zeeland
Politicians from Haarlem
Independent politicians in the Netherlands
Leiden University alumni
Commanders of the Order of the Netherlands Lion